WHP may refer to:

Engineering and technology
 Wafer-handling plasma, a machine used to load/unload solar wafers into/from a plasma oven
 Wellhead platform, the platform located above the head of a gas or oil well and used to drill and to operate the well
 with high probability, mathematical term
 Wheel horsepower
wireless home phone

Media
 WHP (AM), a radio station licensed to serve Harrisburg, Pennsylvania, United States
 WHP-TV, a television station licensed to serve Harrisburg, Pennsylvania, United States
 WRVV, a radio station licensed to serve Harrisburg, Pennsylvania, United States, which held the call sign WHP-FM from 1946 to 1992

Music and entertainment
 The Warehouse Project, a series of club nights organised in Manchester, England
 "Wild Honey Pie", a 1968 song from The Beatles (aka "The White Album")
 Walang Hanggang Paalam, a Philippine drama television series

Places
 Western Highlands (Papua New Guinea), a province of Papua New Guinea
 West Hampstead Thameslink railway station (National Rail station code WHP), a railway station in London, England
 Whiteman Airport (IATA code WHP), a general aviation airport located in Los Angeles, California, United States

Other
 Weekend Hashtag Project, the abbreviation used by Instagrammers as a hashtag in itself or in front of the subject used as a weekly project
 White House Police Force, founded in 1922, now the Uniformed Division of the U.S. Secret Service
 Weapon Hit Points, used in Dark Cloud, a fairly popular PS2 game, to represent the current weapons durability.